Heinz Hess (June 2, 1922 – March 5, 1992) was a German architect best known for his involvement in the construction of 20 churches in and around Mannheim.

Career 
Hess began his study of architecture at Karlsruhe University in 1940, but interrupted his education between 1941 and 1945 to fight in the Second World War. He received his diploma in 1948 after resuming his studies under Otto Ernst Schweizer and Heinrich Müller, and became an assistant to Müller. In 1951, he presented his thesis and took employment in the civil service, where he worked alongside Horst Linde. In 1956, Hess accepted a position with the construction offices of the Roman Catholic Archdiocese of Freiburg, and from 1986 headed the organisation following the retirement of Hans Rolli. From 1972 to 1977, Hess also served as Chief of department in Heidelberg.

Works 
His works include:
St.-Antonius-Kirche in Mannheim-Rheinau with Hans Rolli 1960
St.-Theresia-Kirche in Mannheim-Pfingstberg 1961
St.-Hildegard-Kirche in Mannheim-Käfertal 1961
St.-Konrad-Kirche in Mannheim-Casterfeld 1964
St.-Martin-Kirche in Mannheim-Luzenberg 1966
Zwölf-Apostel-Kirche in Mannheim-Vogelstang 1969
Enlargement of St.-Remigius-Kirche in Heddesheim

Gallery

Notes

References 
 Schnell, Hugo. Twentieth Century Church Architecture in Germany. Schnell & Steiner, 1974.
 Werner, Wolf-Holzäpfel. Katholischer Kirchenbau in Mannheim von 1874 bis heute: Zur Geschichte des Sakralbaus in Nordbaden im 19. und 20. Jahrhundert. Mannheim, 1999.

External links 

1922 births
1992 deaths
20th-century German architects